Gabriel Count Cortois de Pressigny (Dijon, December 11, 1745 - Paris, May 2, 1823) was a French prelate, Bishop of Saint-Malo and then Archbishop of Besançon.

Biography
Born in Dijon on December 11, 1745, Gabriel Cortois de Pressigny is the son of Claude-Antoine Cortois, coseigneur of Quincey, counselor to the Parliament of Burgundy, and Anne de Mussy. He was the youngest brother of Pierre-Marie-Magdeleine Cortois Balore successively bishop of the former diocese of Alais and Nîmes and the nephew of Gabriel Cortois de Quincey, Bishop of Belley.

Vicar General of Langres, abbot commendatory of Saint-Jacques in the diocese of Béziers, he was prior of the priory of Commagny in Moulins-Engilbert, of which he holds the benefit at the time of the Revolution. He was appointed Bishop of Saint-Malo on December 11, 1785, and consecrated on January 15, 1786, by the bishops of Langres, Dijon and Chalons. He chose as vicar general Jacques-Julien Mesle Grandclos, who was first archdeacon and, since 1782, abbot commendatory of the Abbey of Notre-Dame de la Chaume Machecoul.

On October 14, 1790, he was served the civil constitution of the French clergy and the abolition of his diocese by a decree of the National Assembly. Refusing to take the prescribed oath, he found himself forced into exile, first in Chambéry, then in Switzerland and Bavaria.

Returning to France after the signing of the 1801 Concordat, he played no role under the First Empire. He offered his resignation to the Pope only in 1816, a typical attitude of the survivors of the  Ancien Régime episcopate, ultra-royalist and Gallican.

Charged in August 1814 by Louis XVIII with negotiating a new concordat with the Holy See, he was recalled in the spring of 1816, and was named peer of France and then Archbishop of Besançon on September 20, 1817. However he did not officially take possession of his see until November 1, 1819. Often absent from the diocese, he died in Paris on May 2, 1823.

References

1745 births
1823 deaths
19th-century Roman Catholic archbishops in France
18th-century French Roman Catholic bishops
Archbishops of Besançon
Bishops of Saint-Malo